The Masoudieh Mansion (Persian: عمارت مسعودیه) is a historical mansion in Tehran, Iran. It was built as a residence for the Qajar prince Mass'oud Mirza Zell-e Soltan in 1878, hence the name Masoudieh.

History 
Masoudieh has gone through many historical events ever since it was built. during the constitutional revolution, due to the disagreements Zell-e Soltan had with Mozaffareddin Shah and later Mohammad Ali Shah, his mansion became a revolutionary foothold. in 1908 a handmade bomb exploded under the Shah's carriage near the mansion, giving him the excuse to carry out the 1908 bombardment of the parliament.

Many of the first cultural institutions of Iran were first founded in Masoudieh. For example, the first national library and national museum were established in this place.

For a short time in 1963-1964 the mansion was used as military college.

It was later given to the ministry of education after the ministry was established. At last, the government decided to give the building to the organization of national heritage(That had not become a ministry at that time yet and operated under Ministry of Culture and Islamic Guidance) on 1 March 1998 and was listed in the national heritage sites of Iran on 17 January 1999 with the number 2190.

Architecture 
The garden of the Masoudieh mansion was built by the order of Mass'oud Mirza Zell-e Soltan, the son of Naser al-Din Shah Qajar in 1295 A.H. It was built by the work of Reza Qoli Khan (nicknamed Siraj al-Mulk) on a land with an area of about 4000 square meters, with an exterior (diwan house) and interior and other annexes.
 Entrance of Masoudiyeh mansion, Baharestan square

Gallery

See Also 
 Iran National Heritage List
 Baharestan
 Negarestan Palace

References 

Palaces in Tehran
Buildings of the Qajar period
1870s establishments in Iran
National works of Iran
Tourist attractions in Tehran